Anna Hélène Paquin (born 24 July 1982) is a Canadian-born New Zealand actress. Born in Winnipeg and raised in Wellington, Paquin made her acting debut portraying Flora McGrath in the romantic drama film The Piano (1993), for which she won the Academy Award for Best Supporting Actress at age 11, making her the second-youngest winner in Oscar history. As a child actress, she received multiple Young Artist Award nominations for her roles in Fly Away Home (1996), The Member of the Wedding (1997), and A Walk on the Moon (1999), and a Screen Actors Guild Award nomination for appearing in Cameron Crowe's comedy-drama film Almost Famous (2000). She also appeared in the films Jane Eyre (1996) and Amistad (1997).

Paquin continued to perform prominent roles into adulthood, portraying mutant superheroine Rogue in the 20th Century Fox X-Men franchise (2000–2014), for which she was nominated for a Saturn Award for her performance in the first installment. Her other film credits include 25th Hour (2002), Trick 'r Treat (2007), Margaret (2011), The Good Dinosaur (2015), and The Irishman (2019). She played the lead role of Sookie Stackhouse in the HBO vampire drama television series True Blood (2008–2014). For her performance in the series, Paquin won the Golden Globe Award for Best Actress in 2009, and was nominated for an additional Golden Globe Award, as well as three Saturn Awards and a Screen Actors Guild Award, in 2010. Among other accolades, Paquin was nominated for a Primetime Emmy Award, a Golden Globe Award, and a Screen Actors Guild Award for her work on the television film Bury My Heart at Wounded Knee (2007). She received an additional Golden Globe Award nomination for her work on the television film The Courageous Heart of Irena Sendler (2009).

Early life 
Anna Hélène Paquin was born on 24 July 1982 in Winnipeg, Manitoba. Her mother, Mary, a New Zealander from Wellington, worked as an English teacher, and her Canadian father, Brian Paquin, worked as a physical education teacher. She is the youngest of three children, with a brother, Andrew, who is a filmmaker, and a sister, Katya, whose partner is the Green Party of New Zealand's former co-leader Russel Norman. All her maternal great-grandparents emigrated from Ireland because of the Great Famine. Her father is of Dutch Mennonite and French descent. The family moved to Wellington when she was four.

While in New Zealand, Paquin attended Raphael House Rudolf Steiner School and Hutt Intermediate School, both in Lower Hutt. Her parents divorced when she was 12. She received her secondary education at Wellington Girls' College. After moving to the U.S. when she was 16, she attended Windward School in Los Angeles, from which she graduated in 2000. She studied at Columbia College for one year, where she lived in Carman Hall, but dropped out to continue her acting career.

Career 

Director Jane Campion was looking for a little girl to play a main role in The Piano, set to film in New Zealand, and a newspaper advertisement was run announcing an open audition. Paquin's sister read the ad and went to try out with a friend; this inspired Paquin to audition. When Campion met Paquin—whose only acting experience had been as a skunk in a school play—she was very impressed with the nine-year-old's performance of the monologue about Flora's father, and she was chosen from among the 5000 candidates. When The Piano was released in 1993 it was lauded by critics, won prizes at a number of film festivals, and eventually became a popular film among a wide audience. Paquin's debut performance in the film earned her the 1993 Academy Award for Best Supporting Actress at the age of 11, making her the second-youngest Oscar winner in history, behind Tatum O'Neal.

The Piano was made as a small independent film and wasn't expected to be widely known, and Paquin and her family did not plan to continue to pursue acting. However, she was invited to the William Morris Agency, and she kept receiving offers for new roles. She systematically rejected them, but she did appear in three commercials for the phone company MCI in 1994. She later made a series of television commercials for Manitoba Telecom Systems in her birth city of Winnipeg. She also appeared as a voice in an audiobook entitled The Magnificent Nose in 1994. In 1996, she appeared in two films. The first role was as young Jane in Jane Eyre. The other was a lead part in Fly Away Home playing a young girl who, after her mother dies, moves in with her father and finds solace in taking care of orphaned goslings. As a teenager, she had roles in other films, including A Walk on the Moon, Finding Forrester, Amistad, Hurlyburly, She's All That and Almost Famous as well as the English dub of Castle in the Sky.

Paquin played the mutant superhero Rogue in the Marvel Comics movie X-Men in 2000, its sequel X2 in 2003, and its third installment, X-Men: The Last Stand, in 2006. Between 2006 and 2007, she starred in, as well as executive-produced Blue State. The film is made by Paquin Films, a production company formed by her and her brother, Andrew. In November 2006, she completed the film Margaret, which was released in 2011. She played Elaine Goodale in HBO's made-for-TV film Bury My Heart at Wounded Knee, based on Dee Brown's best-seller, garnering a Primetime Emmy Award nomination. In 2007, she played the role of Laurie in the horror film Trick 'r Treat, which was released in 2009.

Paquin was cast as waitress Sookie Stackhouse in the HBO series True Blood in 2008, her first role in a TV series. The show is based on The Southern Vampire Mysteries series of novels by Charlaine Harris, set in the fictional town of Bon Temps, Louisiana. The series saw Paquin doing nude scenes for the first time. While working on True Blood, she started dating co-star Stephen Moyer and later married him in 2010. In 2009, Paquin played Irena Sendler, a Polish woman hailed as a heroine of the Holocaust, in The Courageous Heart of Irena Sendler, a CBS TV film biographical film based on the book Mother of the Children of the Holocaust: The Irena Sendler Story, by Anna Mieszkowska. The film was made in Latvia, and was a Hallmark Hall of Fame presentation for the network.

In 2010, Paquin's film The Romantics, a romantic comedy with Josh Duhamel and Katie Holmes, was released in the US at selected cinemas in September. She played a cameo role in Scream 4, alongside Kristen Bell in 2011. She also played the voice of Kristin on an episode of Phineas and Ferb. Paquin reprised her role as Rogue in the 2014 film X-Men: Days of Future Past, but most of her scenes were cut out for the theatrical release. An alternative version of the film with all of Paquin's scenes reinstated was released as The Rogue Cut on 14 July 2015. Paquin voiced Ramsey in Disney•Pixar's film The Good Dinosaur. She also played Nancy Holt, the wife of a Confederate soldier, in the 2016 miniseries Roots.

In June 2016, the Human Rights Campaign released a video in tribute to the victims of the Orlando nightclub shooting; in the video, Paquin and others told the stories of the people killed there. Later in 2017 Paquin starred in television series Bellevue, also being the executive producer, and acted as Nancy Montgomery in the television miniseries Alias Grace. In 2018, she acted in husband Stephen Moyer's directorial debut, The Parting Glass, and in Laurie Collyer's comedy-drama film Furlough.

In 2019, Paquin appeared in Martin Scorsese's critically acclaimed drama, The Irishman. That year, she also produced and starred as Robyn in television series Flack and appeared in the television series The Affair. In 2021, she portrayed the wife of Kurt Warner in the biographical Christian sports film, American Underdog.

Paquin will star in A Friend of the Family for Peacock.

Paquin will star in True Spirit alongside Teagan Croft and Cliff Curtis. It will be aired on Netflix in February 2023. The movie is based on the journey of Jessica Watson, an Australian sailor attempting solo global circumnavigation at 16 years-old.

Personal life 

Paquin holds dual New Zealand and Canadian citizenship. On 5 August 2009, she announced her engagement to her True Blood co-star Stephen Moyer, whom she had been dating since filming the series pilot in 2007. They married on 21 August 2010 at a private residence in Malibu, California. Paquin gave birth to fraternal twins, Charlie and Poppy, on 12 September 2012. She has a stepson, Billy, and a stepdaughter, Lilac, through her marriage to Moyer.

Philanthropy and advocacy 
On 1 April 2010, Paquin came out as bisexual in a public service announcement for the Give a Damn campaign as part of the True Colors Fund, an advocacy group organised by Cyndi Lauper dedicated to LGBT equality. The True Colors Fund was created to "inspire and engage everyone, especially straight people, to become active participants in the advancement of gay, lesbian, bisexual and transgender equality". The video features Anna Paquin stating, "I'm Anna Paquin. I'm bisexual, and I give a damn." When asked about her participation in the video, Paquin responded by saying, "It wasn't like it was a big secret, it was just a cause I cared about and privately supported, but not one that I had ever had an opportunity to speak out about in a way that would be useful. Obviously I know that one person's voice doesn't necessarily do that much, but I just wanted to do my bit." In May 2012, in an Us Weekly interview Paquin rejected the notion that bisexuality is a choice. "My sexuality is not made up, for a bisexual, it's not about gender. That's not the deciding factor to who they're attracted to," stated Paquin. In 2014, she described herself on Twitter as "Proud to be a happily married bisexual mother".

Paquin also supports other charities and foundations such as the Children's Hospital Los Angeles, Make-A-Wish Foundation, Elton John AIDS Foundation, and The Art of Elysium.

Filmography

Film

Television

Theatre

Accolades

See also 
 List of actors with Academy Award nominations
 List of oldest and youngest Academy Award winners and nominees
 List of New Zealand Academy Award winners and nominees

References

External links 

 

1982 births
Living people
20th-century Canadian actresses
20th-century New Zealand actresses
21st-century Canadian actresses
21st-century Canadian LGBT people
21st-century New Zealand actresses
21st-century New Zealand LGBT people
Actresses from Wellington City
Actresses from Winnipeg
Best Drama Actress Golden Globe (television) winners
Best Supporting Actress Academy Award winners
Bisexual actresses
Canadian child actresses
Canadian expatriate actresses in the United States
Canadian film actresses
Canadian LGBT actors
Canadian LGBT rights activists
Canadian people of Dutch descent
Canadian people of French descent
Canadian people of Irish descent
Canadian people of New Zealand descent
Canadian Mennonites
Canadian stage actresses
Canadian television actresses
Canadian voice actresses
Columbia College (New York) alumni
LGBT Mennonites
New Zealand LGBT actors
New Zealand LGBT rights activists
New Zealand child actresses
New Zealand expatriate actresses in the United States
New Zealand film actresses
New Zealand people of Canadian descent
New Zealand people of Dutch descent
New Zealand people of French descent
New Zealand people of Irish descent
New Zealand people of Mennonite descent
New Zealand stage actresses
New Zealand television actresses
New Zealand voice actresses
People educated at Wellington Girls' College
People from Lower Hutt
Theatre World Award winners
Waldorf school alumni